Jeremy "Jez" Peterson is a fictional character from the British Channel 4 soap opera Hollyoaks. He was played by Simon Cole between 2005 and 2006. His first appearance was 15 April 2005.

Storylines
Hailing from a wealthy, rural background, Jeremy had problems fitting into the devoutly down-at-heel world of Hollyoaks Community College's halls of residence. On his arrival many of his roommates thought he was related to the Royal family which led to many of them giving him extra special treatment. However, they eventually realised that Jeremy was just a student with an aristocratic background who had an obsession with computer games.

As Jeremy's background was much different from other student residents at the halls, this often backfired on Jeremy as he found it difficult to adapt with the others. He also had a naïve side to him as his friend Joe Spencer stole money and took a credit card out on Jeremy's name. When Jeremy discovered the truth, with surprise, he did little much and never really got to tell Joe face to face of what he thought of him. Jeremy left Hollyoaks to work as a computer games designer in San Francisco and left Joe a note telling him how hurt he was after his credit card scam.

External links
 Character profile at Hollyoaks.com

Hollyoaks characters
Television characters introduced in 2005
Male characters in television